Cheer Extreme Allstars is a branch of cheerleading and competition dance gyms found throughout North Carolina, South Carolina, Maryland, Illinois, Florida and Virginia. Cheer Extreme is most well known for its Small Senior and Large Senior teams, which received numerous national titles and have ranked in the Cheerleading Worlds competitions, with Cheer Extreme Senior Elite winning the first-place title in 2010, 2012, and 2013. At the 2015 Cheerleading Worlds, Cheer Extreme's Coed Elite won first place. Also at the 2016, 2018, 2019, and 2021 Cheerleading Worlds, Cheer Extreme's SSX won first place. Cheer Extreme has over 850 National Champion titles. In 2009, owner and coach Courtney Smith-Pope, who was a cheerleader for Wake Forest University, won Coach of The Year sponsored by The USASF. In 2013, Cheer Extreme opened a location in Roanoke, Virginia. In 2015, Cheer Extreme opened a location in Waldorf, Maryland. In 2022, they opened up their newest location in Boynton Beach, Florida.

Cheer Extreme was founded in 1994 by Betsy Smith, and is now owned by her daughter and son-in-law, Courtney Smith-Pope and Ben Pope.

Publicity 
Cheer Extreme Senior Elite was invited to a private audition in Charlotte, North Carolina, for the reality television show America's Got Talent, but did not make it on the actual televised show. They have also been featured in Inside Cheerleading Magazine. In 2011, CNN featured specials on Cheer Extreme's Senior Elite and SSX teams while they made their way to the 2011 Cheerleading World Championships.
In the making is a documentary that is reportedly following them through the 2012–2017 seasons. It is being produced by Sarah Tekeste. Cheer Extreme also have their own YouTube channel (JTV), where videos of practices or performances at competitions can be found.

Notable athletes
 Maddie Gardner, news reporter
 Marah Savage, USC cheerleader

References

All Star Cheerleading Gyms
Organizations based in North Carolina
Organizations based in Raleigh, North Carolina
Performing groups established in 1993
Sports in Raleigh, North Carolina
Sports in Charlotte, North Carolina
1993 establishments in North Carolina
Competitive dance